The Frame-Up is a 1937 American crime film directed by D. Ross Lederman.

Cast
 Paul Kelly as Mark MacArthur
 Julie Bishop as Betty Lindale (as Jacqueline Wells)
 George McKay as Joe Lavery
 Robert Emmett O'Connor as Larry Mann aka John Mench
 Ray Bennett as Franey Forrester (as Raphael Bennett)
 Wade Boteler as Police Captain Donovan
 Edward Earle as Ellery Richards
 C. Montague Shaw as James (J.R.) Weston
 John Tyrrell as Soapy Connor (as Johnny Tyrrell)
 Ted Oliver as Spud Gitale
 Horace Murphy as Dr. Phillips

References

External links
 

1937 films
1937 crime films
American crime films
American black-and-white films
1930s English-language films
Films directed by D. Ross Lederman
Columbia Pictures films
1930s American films